Norman Levi (25 February 1927 – 25 December 2015) was an English-born social worker and political figure in British Columbia. He represented Vancouver South from 1968 to 1969, Vancouver-Burrard from 1972 to 1979 and Coquitlam-Maillardville from 1979 to 1983 in the Legislative Assembly of British Columbia as a New Democratic Party (NDP) member.

He was born in Birmingham and served in the British Army from 1943 to 1947. After leaving the army he moved to Canada, then studied at Western Washington University. In 1951, he married Gloria Hammerman. Levi graduated as a social worker and was hired by the John Howard Society in Vancouver. He served as president of the provincial NDP. He was first elected to the provincial assembly in a 1968 by-election held following the death of Thomas Audley Bate. He was defeated when he ran for re-election in 1969 and 1983. Levi served in the provincial cabinet as Minister of Rehabilitation and Social Improvement and as Minister of Human Resources. He died on 25 December 2015.

References 

1927 births
2015 deaths
British Army personnel of World War II
British Army officers
British Columbia New Democratic Party MLAs
Canadian socialists
Canadian social workers
British emigrants to Canada
Members of the Executive Council of British Columbia
People from Birmingham, West Midlands
Politicians from Vancouver
Western Washington University alumni
20th-century Canadian politicians